Ahmet Bozkurt (born 11 September 1977, Erzincan, Turkey) is a Turkish poet, essayist, novelist, and editor.

He took part in the committee of the edition of the review titled “ Taşra” which had been published in Erzincan with his friends between 1998-1999. He started to publish the review titled “ Le poète travaille” on 2000 in Erzincan. “Le poète travaille” has become the fund of a negotiation inflamed of the concepts such as province, center and autochthon in Turkish literature. Graduated from Dramaturgy from  the University of Dokuz Eylül of the Fine Arts Department. Member of the Cumali- Seferi, Gökyüzü Derneği and of PEN. He published plays of theatre, essays, literary and picturesque critics with his work of arts in the pursuit of the sensitiveness to the origin of the truth of the existential memory and creation of the poetry in the language and lingual functions of the self-subject, the self in the poetry, the formation of the artistic language, structuralism, postmodernism-modernism, the philosophy of language and the poems. His essays on the painting and the poetry took place in numerous common books. He presented proceedings in symposiums of poetry and literature. He is still living in İstanbul and is the editor of a publishing house.

Bibliography
 Şair Çalışıyor, İstanbul 2007, Şiirden Yayınları.
 Varlık Tutulması: Jean-Paul Sartre Tiyatrosunda Varlık ve Hiçlik, İstanbul 2012, Ayrıntı Yayınları.
 Orpheus’un Bakışı, İstanbul 2014, Ayrıntı Yayınları.
 Unutma Zamanı: Yazı, Bellek ve Eleştiri, İstanbul 2015.
 Mum Lekesi: Eleştirinin Kıyıları, İstanbul 2016.
 Şiir-Fragmanlar: Her Yüz Bir Dünyadır, İstanbul 2017.
 Ku’yu, İstanbul 2018.
 Montaigne, Denemeler İstanbul 2018. 
 Dünyadan 100 Aşk Şiiri, İstanbul 2020.

References

https://kultur.istanbul/babil-kitapligi-soylesileri-basligiyla-gerceklesen-kultur-istanbul-bulusmalarinin-ilk-konugu-yazar-burhan-sonmez-oldu/
https://kultur.istanbul/dogan-hizlan/
https://kultur.istanbul/kultur-istanbul-bulusmalarinda-semih-gumus-ile-oyku-uzerine/
http://www.cumhuriyet.com.tr/haber/sair-ahmet-bozkurttan-beklenen-siir-kitabi-kuyu-1095578
https://www.bcatimes.com/sair-ahmet-bozkurt-ile-roportaj/
https://www.cnnturk.com/kultur-sanat/kitap/sair-ahmet-bozkurttan-yeni-siir-kitabi-kuyu
https://www.ayrintiyayinlari.com.tr/kisi/ahmet-bozkurt/331
https://www.hurriyet.com.tr/troia-ya-siir-yakisir-4424922]
https://www.hurriyet.com.tr/yazarlar/dogan-hizlan/montaignee-cok-sey-borcluyum-40991743
https://www.hurriyet.com.tr/yazarlar/dogan-hizlan/kitap-fuarindan-notlar-41448336
https://books.google.com.tr/books?id=b5c7DwAAQBAJ&pg=PT211&lpg=PT211&dq=ahmet+bozkurt+Doğan+Hızlan&source=bl&ots=VhJ5-FS1ve&sig=ACfU3U1yztwWEUOKXK2J90T1YhuXCHCRcA&hl=tr&sa=X&ved=2ahUKEwjFzeaDgfnnAhVDXpoKHQ7yB5MQ6AEwEHoECAkQAQ#v=onepage&q=ahmet%20bozkurt%20&f=false

1977 births
Turkish poets
Living people
Dokuz Eylül University alumni